Filippos Petsalnikos (1 December 1950 – 13 March 2020) was a Greek politician of Macedonian origin for the Movement of Democratic Socialists. From 2009 to 2012, he served as Speaker of the Hellenic Parliament. Before, he was a Member of the Hellenic Parliament from 1985 to 2012.

Life
Born in Mavrochori, Kastoria, Petsalnikos studied law in Greece and Germany.

Political career
In 1985, he was elected for the first time as an MP for the Panhellenic Socialist Movement (PASOK).

He served as the Minister for Macedonia-Thrace between 22 October 1996 and 30 October 1998, the Minister of Public Order between 30 October 1998 and 19 February 1999. Petsalnikos resigned in the aftermath of the Abdullah Öcalan's capture. Later he acted as the Minister of Justice between 24 October 2001 and 10 March 2004. He was elected to the position of Speaker on 15 October 2009 by 168 of the Parliament's 300 MPs.

On 3 January 2015, it was announced that Petsalnikos would join former prime minister Papandreou in leaving PASOK to found the new Movement of Democratic Socialists.

Personal life
He was married and had three children. Petsalnikos spoke Greek, Macedonian, English and German. His wife is an attorney and supports (2005) DKIZ, which is (2011) a selfhelp-organisation run by and for German speaking women in Greece.

References

External links
 

|-

|-

|-

1950 births
2020 deaths
PASOK politicians
Movement of Democratic Socialists politicians
Speakers of the Hellenic Parliament
Justice ministers of Greece
Greek MPs 1985–1989
Greek MPs 1989 (June–November)
Greek MPs 1989–1990
Greek MPs 1990–1993
Greek MPs 1993–1996
Greek MPs 1996–2000
Greek MPs 2000–2004
Greek MPs 2004–2007
Greek MPs 2007–2009
Greek MPs 2009–2012
Ministers of Public Order of Greece
Knights Commander of the Order of Merit of the Federal Republic of Germany
People from Kastoria (regional unit)